The name Judith has been used for four tropical cyclones worldwide: two in the Atlantic Ocean, one in the South-West Indian Ocean, and one in the Western Pacific Ocean.

In the Atlantic:
 Hurricane Judith (1959) – affected the western Caribbean and made landfall in Florida
 Tropical Storm Judith (1966) – formed north of Barbados and crossed through the Windward Islands

In the South-West Indian:
 Tropical Storm Martha–Judith (1966) – crossed over from the Australian region, remained over the open ocean
 
In the Western Pacific:
Typhoon Judith (1949) – brushed Okinawa and struck western Kyushu

Atlantic hurricane set index articles
Pacific typhoon set index articles
South-West Indian Ocean cyclone set index articles